The 1980 Soviet Cup was an association football cup competition of the Soviet Union. The winner of the competition, Shakhter Donetsk qualified for the continental tournament.

Competition schedule

Group stage
Games took place between February 25 – March 12, 1980.

Group 1
 [Sochi, Adler]
 1.Fakel Voronezh            5   2  2  1   5- 3   6  Qualified 
 2.Spartak Moskva            5   2  2  1   5- 4   6  Qualified 
 --------------------------------------------------
 3.Metallist Kharkov         5   1  4  0   2- 1   6 
 4.Zenit Leningrad           5   1  3  1   5- 3   5 
 5.Kuban Krasnodar           5   1  2  2   4- 5   4 
 6.Krylya Sovetov Kuibyshev  5   1  1  3   1- 6   3

Group 2
 [Samarkand]
 1.Shakhtyor Donetsk         5   5  0  0   9- 2  10  Qualified 
 2.Tavria Simferopol         5   3  1  1  11- 6   7  Qualified 
 --------------------------------------------------
 3.Chernomorets Odessa       5   1  3  1   5- 6   5 
 4.Zarya Voroshilovgrad      5   1  2  2   6- 8   4 
 5.Spartak Nalchik           5   1  2  2   3- 5   4 
 6.Kuzbass Kemerovo          5   0  0  5   3-10   0

Group 3
 [Uzhgorod]
 1.Dinamo Kiev               5   5  0  0  13- 1  10  Qualified 
 2.Nistru Kishinev           5   3  1  1  13-10   7  Qualified 
 --------------------------------------------------
 3.Karpaty Lvov              5   3  0  2   8- 6   6 
 4.Lokomotiv Moskva          5   1  1  3   3- 8   3 
 5.Dnepr Dnepropetrovsk      5   1  0  4   3- 9   2 
 6.Spartak Ivano-Frankovsk   5   0  2  3   2- 8   2

Group 4
 [Tbilisi, Rustavi]
 1.Dinamo Tbilisi            5   5  0  0  13- 4  10  Qualified 
 2.Kayrat Alma-Ata           5   4  0  1   8- 2   8  Qualified 
 --------------------------------------------------
 3.Torpedo Kutaisi           5   2  0  3   6- 8   4 
 4.Spartak Orjonikidze       5   1  1  3   2- 4   3 
 5.SKA Khabarovsk            5   1  1  3   3- 8   3 
 6.SKA Odessa                5   1  0  4   2- 8   2

Group 5
 [Baku, Sumgait]
 1.Neftchi Baku              5   5  0  0  13- 2  10  Qualified 
 2.Dinamo Minsk              5   3  1  1  10- 1   7  Qualified 
 --------------------------------------------------
 3.Žalgiris Vilnius          5   2  1  2   7- 6   5 
 4.Zvezda Perm               5   1  3  1   2- 2   5 
 5.Dinamo Leningrad          5   0  2  3   1- 8   2 
 6.Terek Grozny              5   0  1  4   0-14   1

Group 6
 [Yerevan]
 1.Ararat Yerevan            5   4  1  0   9- 3   9  Qualified 
 2.Torpedo Moskva            5   3  1  1   4- 3   7  Qualified 
 --------------------------------------------------
 3.Kolos Nikopol             5   2  1  2   6- 7   5 
 4.Metallurg Zaporozhye      5   1  1  3   5- 5   3 
 5.Shinnik Yaroslavl         5   1  1  3   4- 7   3 
 6.Iskra Smolensk            5   1  1  3   3- 6   3

Group 7
 [Dushanbe]
 1.CSKA Moskva               5   4  1  0  10- 0   9  Qualified 
 2.SKA Rostov-na-Donu        5   3  2  0   5- 1   8  Qualified 
 --------------------------------------------------
 3.Pamir Dushanbe            5   3  1  1   7- 3   7 
 4.Kolhozchi Ashkhabad       5   1  1  3   3- 5   3 
 5.UralMash Sverdlovsk       5   1  1  3   2- 4   3 
 6.Guria Lanchkhuti          5   0  0  5   2-16   0

Group 8
 [Fergana]
 1.Pahtakor Tashkent         4   3  0  1   7- 5   6  Qualified 
 --------------------------------------------------
 2.Traktor Pavlodar          4   2  2  0   6- 3   6 
 3.Buston Jizak              4   1  1  2   4- 3   3 
 4.Dinamo Stavropol          4   1  1  2   2- 4   3 
 5.Alga Frunze               4   1  0  3   3- 7   2

Play-off stage

Round of 16
 [Mar 15] 
 ARARAT Yerevan          3-2  Nistru Kishinev 
   [Robert Galustyan 38, Khoren Oganesyan 75 pen, Samvel Kasaboglyan 76 – 
    Yuriy Khlopotnov 18, Armenak Sarkisyan (A) 54 og. Att: 18,000] 
 DINAMO Kiev             2-0  Kayrat Alma-Ata     [in Uzhgorod] 
   [Leonid Buryak 55, 73 pen. Att: 10,000] 
 DINAMO Moskva           2-0  Dinamo Minsk        [in Sochi] 
   [Alexandr Bubnov 52, Alexei Petrushin 58. Att: 8,000] 
 PAHTAKOR Tashkent       2-1  Neftchi Baku        [aet] 
   [Nizam Nartajiyev 102, Zurab Tsereteli 120 pen – Igor Sokolovskiy 111. Att: 7,000] 
 [Mar 16] 
 SKA Rostov-na-Donu      1-2  SHAKHTYOR Donetsk 
   [Vyacheslav Dekteryov 43 – Vitaliy Starukhin 28, Vladimir Safonov 32. Att: 6,000] 
 SPARTAK Moskva          2-0  CSKA Moskva 
   [Sergei Shavlo 42 pen, Yevgeniy Sidorov 60. Att: 4,500] 
 Tavria Simferopol       0-4  DINAMO Tbilisi 
   [Revaz Chelebadze 4 pen, Vakhtang Kopaleishvili 52, Vakhtang Koridze 83, 
    Vladimir Gutsayev 87. Att: 35,000] 
 [Mar 20] 
 TORPEDO Moskva          5-0  Fakel Voronezh 
   [Rais Gilmanov 5, 59, Nikolai Vasilyev 24, Vladimir Sakharov 48, 
    Viktor Losev 75. Att: 4,500]

Quarterfinals
 [Mar 30] 
 DINAMO Kiev             2-0  Dinamo Moskva       [in Uzhgorod] 
   [Vladimir Bessonov 48, Leonid Buryak 68 pen. Att: 10,000] 
 DINAMO Tbilisi          2-1  Pahtakor Tashkent   [aet] 
   [Revaz Chelebadze 85 pen, 101 – Nuritdin Amriyev 50. Att: 45,000] 
 SHAKHTYOR Donetsk       2-0  Torpedo Moskva      [in Gorlovka] 
   [Mikhail Sokolovskiy 30, Vitaliy Starukhin 67 pen. Att: 13,000] 
 SPARTAK Moskva          1-0  Ararat Yerevan 
   [Yuriy Gavrilov 18. Att: 4,500]

Semifinals
 [May 30] 
 Dinamo Tbilisi         2-1  Dynamo Kyiv
   [ Alexandr Chivadze 50, Vitali Daraselia 85 – Vadym Yevtushenko 33. Att: 75,000] 
 Spartak Moscow         0-1  Shakhtar Donetsk
   [ Mykhaylo Sokolovskyi 38. Att: 68,000]

Final

External links
 Complete calendar. helmsoccer.narod.ru
 1980 Soviet Cup. Footballfacts.ru
 1980 Soviet football season. RSSSF

Soviet Cup seasons
Cup
Soviet Cup
Soviet Cup